Bhetaguri is a small town in Cooch Behar district under DINHATA police station of West Bengal, India. Bhetaguri is connected by road and railway to the district Headquarters.

Villages in Cooch Behar district